René Basset (7 October 1919 – 12 October 2021) was a French photographer. He received the Niépce Prize in 1958.

Biography
Basset's became a photographer in 1932 and created a studio in Lyon in 1949. He was a founding member of the groups Forme et Lumière and Forum. He was the oldest surviving recipient of the Niépce Prize.

René Basset died on 12 October 2021 at the age of 102.

Exhibitions
Rétrospective (1994, Lyon)
Transparences (2000, La Ricamarie)
Photogravure, la photo comme estampe (2000, Villeurbanne)
Figures (2001, Francheville)
Lyon Nostalgie (2013, Saint-Cyr-au-Mont-d'Or)

Bibliography

References

1919 births
2021 deaths
French photographers
20th-century photographers
French centenarians
Men centenarians
People from Lyon